Stockton is a hamlet in Shropshire, England.

It forms part of the civil parish of Chirbury with Brompton and is just on the English side of the Wales-England border. The River Camlad flows to the south and there was once a mill (Stockton Mill).

See also
Listed buildings in Chirbury with Brompton

References

Hamlets in Shropshire